Dream Concert (드림콘서트) is one of the largest K-pop joint concerts in South Korea, which has been annually hosted by the Korea Entertainment Producer's Association (KEPA) since 1995. Each year, a number of the most popular K-pop artists of the year join the event for their performances.

Locations and dates

1990s

2000s

2010s

2020s

See also
 KCON

References

K-pop concerts
K-pop festivals
Music festivals established in 1995